Carl Leo Pierson (1891–1977) was an American film editor who edited more than 200 films (primarily low-budget Westerns for Monogram and Republic) and television episodes over the course of his lengthy career in Hollywood. He also produced and directed a handful of movies.

Biography 
Carl Pierson was born in Indianapolis, Indiana. He was married at least twice: first Minerva Jane Sherwood in 1924, who filed for divorce in 1930; and then to an actress Mary; she sued for divorce in 1939. He had a daughter, Lois, with his first wife.

Filmography (as editor) 

 That Tennessee Beat (1966)
 Hand of Death (1962)
 Womanhunt (1962)
 The Two Little Bears (1961)
 The Silent Call (1961)
 The Little Shepherd of Kingdom Come (1961)
 Sniper's Ridge (1961)
 Diamond Safari (1958)
 She Devil (1958)
 Stagecoach to Fury (1956)
 Naked Gun (1956)
 Yaqui Drums (1956) 
 Massacre (1956)
 The Big Chase (1954)
 The Black Pirates (1954)
 Sins of Jezebel (1953)
 The Great Jesse James Raid (1952)
 Leave It to the Marines (1951)
 Savage Drums (1951)
 Little Big Horn (1951)
 Pier 23 (1951)
 Roaring City (1951)
 Mask of the Dragon (1951)
 Fingerprints Don't Lie (1951)
 Three Desperate Men (1951)
 Bandit Queen (1950)
 Border Rangers (1950)
 Train to Tombstone (1950)
 Gunfire (1950)
 I Shot Billy the Kid (1950)
 Western Pacific Agent (1950)
 Radar Secret Service (1950)
 Roaring Westward (1949)
 Brand of Fear (1949)
 Gun Law Justice (1949)
 Courtin' Trouble (1948)
 Outlaw Brand (1948)
 Cowboy Cavalier (1948)
 Why Girls Leave Home (1945)
 Dangerous Intruder (1945)
 Minstrel Man (1944)
 Block Busters (1944)
 Return of the Ape Man (1944)
 Follow the Leader (1944)
 Voodoo Man (1944)
 Million Dollar Kid (1944)
 Raiders of the Border (1944)
 Death Valley Rangers (1943)
The Crime Smasher (1943)
 The Texas Kid (1943)
 Mr. Muggs Steps Out (1943)
 Outlaws of Stampede Pass (1943)
 Spotlight Scandals (1943)
 Here Comes Kelly (1943)
 The Law Rides Again (1943)
 Ghosts on the Loose (1943)
 Wings Over the Pacific (1943)
 The Stranger from Pecos (1943)
 Sarong Girl (1943)
 Clancy Street Boys (1943)
 The Ape Man (1943)
 Kid Dynamite (1943)
 You Can't Beat the Law (1943)
 Dawn on the Great Divide (1942)
 Rhythm Parade (1942)
 'Neath Brooklyn Bridge (1942)
 Bowery at Midnight (1942)
 City of Silent Men (1942)
 Down Texas Way (1942)
 Inside the Law (1942)
 Ghost Town Law (1942)
 Black Dragons (1942)
 Mr. Wise Guy (1942)
 Below the Border (1942)
 Forbidden Trails (1941)
 Road to Happiness (1941)
 The Gunman from Bodie (1941)
 Reg'lar Fellers (1941)
 Arizona Bound (1941)
 That Gang of Mine (1940)
 Boys of the City (1940)
 The Mad Empress (1939)
 Sky Patrol (1939)
 Stunt Pilot (1939)
 Double Deal (1939)
 Wolf Call (1939)
 Mystery Plane (1939)
 The Phantom Stage (1939)
 Ghost Town Riders (1938)
 King of the Sierras (1938)
 Prairie Justice (1938)
 Paroled from the Big House (1938)
 Guilty Trails (1938)
 Black Bandit (1938)
 Rebellious Daughters (1938)
 Where the West Begins (1938)
 Spirit of Youth (1938)
 Western Gold (1937)
 The Outer Gate (1937)
 The Legion of Missing Men (1937)
 The Californian (1937)
 Reefer Madness (1936)
 I Cover Chinatown (1936)
 Red River Valley (1936)
 Frisco Waterfront (1935)
 Lawless Range (1935)
 Cappy Ricks Returns (1935)
 Westward Ho (1935)
 Honeymoon Limited (1935)
 The Dawn Rider (1935)
 The Hoosier Schoolmaster (1935)
 The Desert Trail (1935)
 The Nut Farm (1935)
 Rainbow Valley (1935)
 The Mystery Man (1935)
 Texas Terror (1935) 
 Sing Sing Nights (1934) 
 'Neath the Arizona Skies (1934) 
 Flirting with Danger (1934) 
 Lost in the Stratosphere (1934) 
 A Girl of the Limberlost (1934) 
 Tomorrow's Youth (1934) 
 Happy Landing (1934) 
 Jane Eyre (1934) 
 The Star Packer (1934) 
 Million Dollar Baby (1934)
 Randy Rides Alone (1934) 
 Monte Carlo Nights (1934) 
 The Man from Utah (1934) 
 Blue Steel (1934) 
 Manhattan Love Song (1934) 
 House of Mystery (1934) 
 Mystery Liner (1934) 
 West of the Divide (1934) 
 A Woman's Man (1934) 
 The Lucky Texan (1934) 
 Sixteen Fathoms Deep (1934)
 Trailing North (1933)
 Sagebrush Trail (1933)
 Broken Dreams (1933)
 Riders of Destiny (1933)
 The Devil's Mate (1933)
 Galloping Romeo (1933)
 The Gallant Fool (1933)
 The Return of Casey Jones (1933)
 Diamond Trail (1933)
 Wine, Women and Song (1933)
 The Phantom Broadcast (1933)
 Breed of the Border (1933)
 The Fugitive (1933)
 West of Singapore (1933)
 Sensation Hunters (1933)
 A Strange Adventure (1932)
 The Girl from Calgary (1932)
 Broadway to Cheyenne (1932)
 Hidden Valley (1932)
 Son of Oklahoma (1932)
 The Arm of the Law (1932)
 Honor of the Mounted (1932)
 The Man from Hell's Edges (1932)
 Vanishing Men (1932)
 Police Court (1932)
 The Law of the Sea (1931)
 The Florodora Girl (1930)
 Montana Moon (1930)
 The Mysterious Island (1929)
 The Baby Cyclone (1928)
 Rose-Marie (1928)

References 

American film editors
1891 births
1977 deaths
People from Indianapolis
American film directors